The Divisiones Regionales de Fútbol in the Balearic Islands, are organized by Balearic Football Federation :
Primera Regional Preferente de Mallorca (Level 6 of the Spanish football pyramid)
Regional Preferente de Menorca (Level 6)
Regional de Ibiza y Formentera (Level 6)
Primera Regional de las Islas Baleares (Level 7)
Segunda Regional de las Islas Baleares (Level 8)
Tercera Regional de las Islas Baleares (Level 9)

League chronology
Timeline

Primera Regional Preferente de Mallorca
 
The Primera Regional Preferente de Mallorca is one of the lower levels of the Spanish Football League. It is held every year. It stands at the sixth level of Spanish football. All of the clubs are based on the island of Mallorca.

The League 
The league consists of 20 teams. At the end of the season, the champion is promoted to Tercera División RFEF - Group 11 while the next six clubs (runner-up thru 7th) advance to promotion playoff. Bottom three teams are relegated to Primera Regional de las Islas Baleares.

2021–22 season teams

Champions

Regional Preferente de Menorca
 
The Regional Preferente de Menorca is one of the lower levels of the Spanish Football League. It stands at the sixth level of Spanish football with teams five promotions away from the top division. Teams from this league progress into the Tercera División RFEF Group 11 via Play Offs against teams from Evissa and Mallorca. The participating teams are based on the island of Menorca.

The League
The Regional Preferente is played with 10 clubs. At the end of the season, the champion advances to the promotion playoff.

2021–22 season teams

Champions

Regional Preferente Ibiza/Formentera
 
The Regional Preferente de Ibiza y Formentera is the sixth level of association football in Ibiza & Formentera (Balearic Islands).

The League
The winner advances to a promotion playoff against three teams from Primera Regional Preferente de Mallorca.

2022–23 season teams

Champions

Primera Regional de las Islas Baleares
 
Primera Regional de las Islas Baleares is the seventh level of competition of the Spanish Football League in Balearic Islands.

The League
The Primera Regional is played with 20 teams. At the end of the season, the first three are promoted. Three clubs are relegated to Segunda Regional.

Segunda Regional de las Islas Baleares
 
Segunda Regional de las Islas Baleares is the eighth level of competition of the Spanish Football League in Balearic Islands.

The League
The Segunda Regional is played with 20 teams. At the end of the season, the top three clubs are promoted. Three clubs are relegated to Tercera Regional.

Tercera Regional de las Islas Baleares
 
Tercera Regional de las Islas Baleares is the ninth level of competition of the Spanish Football League in Balearic Islands.

The League
The Tercera Regional is played with 31 teams in two groups of 15 and 16. At the end of the season, the champions and the best runner-up are promoted.

External links
Federació de Futbol de les Illes Balears
Futbolme.com

Football in the Balearic Islands
Divisiones Regionales de Fútbol